A Show of Hands is the first album released by bassist Victor Wooten.  The album features bass guitar with only the accompaniment of vocals.  The album features almost entirely slap bass, using a large amount of Wooten's signature open-hammer-pluck technique.

Track listing

Personnel
Victor Wooten – bass, vocals, voice
JD Blair – vocals
Cortney and Brittany Knight – vocals, voices
Michael Saleem – vocals
Mark "Zeke" Sellers – vocals
Roy Wooten – vocals
Joseph Wooten- vocals, voice
Michael Kott – vocals, voice
Elijah "Pete" Wooten – voice
Park Law – vocals
Kurt Story – vocals
Martin Luther King Jr. – pre-recorded sample from a speech
Malcolm X – pre-recorded sample from a speech
Aashid – voice
Dorothy G. Wooten – voice

References 

1996 debut albums
Victor Wooten albums